Crazy Colonel is a comedy television series in Kannada directed by Lingaraj in the 1980s. It featured Ramesh Bhat and Girija Lokesh in leading roles. Bhat plays a retired and eccentric Colonel who lives with his wife (Girija Lokesh) and Black Labrador named Caesar. Each episode showcases his escapades in trying to woo young girls by his charm and getting caught by his well aware wife.

Cast 
Ramesh Bhat as Crazy Colonel
Girija Lokesh as Colonel's wife
Prashanti Nayak as Rukmini (the neighbor)

References 

Indian comedy television series